Istituto Leonardo da Vinci (LdV) is a private Italian international school located in Lugano, Switzerland. It serves levels scuola primaria (primary school) through liceo (senior high school/sixth form college).

Accreditation
LdV's (upper) secondary education (Middle and High School) is not approved as a Mittelschule/Collège/Liceo by the Swiss Federal State Secretariat for Education, Research and Innovation (SERI).

References

External links
 Istituto Leonardo da Vinci

Italian international schools in Switzerland
Lugano
Schools in the canton of Ticino